Events from the year 1612 in Ireland.

Incumbent
Monarch: James I

Events
April 10 – a royal charter of King James VI and I creates the City and County of Londonderry, and The Honourable The Irish Society to run the new plantation.
The town of Roscommon is incorporated.

Births
October 20 – Richard Boyle, 1st Earl of Burlington, cavalier and Lord High Treasurer of Ireland (d. 1698)
Edward King, poet (d. 1637)

Deaths
February 1 – Conor O'Devany, 8th Roman Catholic Bishop of Down and Connor, executed for high treason (b. c. 1532)
February 1 – Patrick O'Loughran, Roman Catholic priest, executed for high treason.

Publications
John Davies – Discoverie of the True Causes why Ireland was never entirely subdued.[sic]

References

 
1610s in Ireland
Ireland
Years of the 17th century in Ireland